70D may refer to:

 Canon EOS 70D DSLR camera introduced in 2013
 Tesla Model S 70D, all-electric sedan
 Tesla Model X 70D, all-electric cross-over SUV (XUV/CUV)

See also
 D70 (disambiguation)
 70 (disambiguation)